Sambor Prei Kuk is an archaeological site in Cambodia located in Kampong Thom Province,  north of Kampong Thom, the provincial capital,  east of Angkor and  north of Phnom Penh. The now ruined complex dates back to the Pre-Angkorian Chenla Kingdom (late 6th to 9th century), established by king Isanavarman I as central royal sanctuary and capital, known then as "Isanapura".  In 2017, Sambor Prei Kuk was declared a UNESCO World Heritage Site.

Located on the Eastern bank of the Tonle Sap lake, close to the Steung Saen River, the central part of Sambor Prei Kuk is divided into three main groups. Each group has a square layout surrounded by a brick wall. The structures of the overall archaeological area were constructed at variable times: the southern and north groups (7th century) by Isanavarman I, who is considered a possible founder of the city and the central group (later date). 
The buildings of Sambor Prei Kuk are characteristic of the Pre-Angkorean period with a simple external plan. The principal material is brick, but sandstone is also used for certain structures.
Architectural features include numerous prasats, octagonal towers, shiva lingams and yonis, ponds and reservoirs, and lion sculptures. Sambor Prei Kuk is located amidst mature sub-tropical forests with limited undergrowth. The area has been mined and could still contain unexploded ordnance.

The Clusters 

The whole compound is made of three clusters classified as group C for Central, N for North and S for South (Michon & Kalay, 2012). They are enclosed in a double-walled encircling 1,000 acre in which there were 150 Hindu temples today mostly in ruins.

 Group N: Prasat Sambor (ប្រាសាទសំបូរ) is considered the main temple and it dates from the 7th century. It was dedicated to one of the reincarnations of Shiva known as Gambhireshvara (from Sanskrit गम्भीर - gambhir, profound, deep, solemn - and शिव, shvara, Shiva, Śiva, The Auspicious One).  
 Group S: Prasat Yeah Puon (ប្រាសាទយាយព័ន្ធ) includes 22 sanctuaries dated from the 7th century (600 - 635 AD) during the reign of Isanavarman I in dedication to Shiva.
 Group C: It is occupied by the Central Sanctuary or Prasat Boram (ប្រាសាទបុរាម) with lion sculptures that had inspired the popular name of Prasat Tao (The Lions' Temple). It is, however, the newest group dating the 9th century. The other main feature is the Tower of Ashram Issey, but there were also other constructions (18 temples) now in ruined (Palmer, 2011).

History

7th century 

Isanavarman I reigned over the Chenla Kingdom between 616 and 637 AD, taking Isanabura as his capital and it is argued that he built the main temple Prasat Sambor (Group N), as there is an inscription on the site attributed to his reign and dated 13 September 627 AD. The king is also known for sending his first embassy to the court of the Sui Dynasty in China (616-617). Chenla conquered different principalities in the Northwest of Cambodia after the end of the Chinese reign period yǒnghuī (永徽) (i. e. after 31 January 656), which previously (in 638/39) paid tribute to China. An inscription dating from the reign of Isanarvarman I claimed that he was, “the King of Kings, who rules over Suvarnabhumi”. Dr Vong Sotheara, of the Royal University of Phnom Penh, claimed that the inscription would “prove that Suvarnabhumi was the Khmer Empire.”

The last important king in Isanapura was Jayavarman I, whose death caused turmoil to the kingdom at the start of the 8th century, breaking it in many principalities and opening the way to a new time: Angkor. This site is also claimed as an early capital of Jayavarman II (O'Reilly & Jacques, 1990).

20th century 

After the Lon Nol's coup d'état to Prince Norodom Sihanouk in 1970, US President Richard Nixon ordered a secret bombing of Cambodia to fight the Khmer Rouge guerrillas and any influence of North Vietnam in the country. The US aircraft bombed positions inside the archaeological site, causing craters near the temples, while the guerrillas left several mines on the land that were cleared only in 2008.

This site was added to the UNESCO World Heritage list on 8 July 2017.

Official religion 

The official religion at Sambor Prei Kuk city was Shaivism, one of the four most widely followed sects of Hinduism, which reveres the god Shiva as the Supreme Being and the Lingam (in Sanskrit लिङ्गं, liṅgaṃ, meaning "mark", "sign", or "inference") or Shiva linga representing Shiva to be worshiped in temples. In Cambodia as it is in India, the lingam is a symbol of the energy and potential of god Shiva himself and this phallic symbol is often represented with the Yoni (Sanskrit: योनि yoni, literally "vagina" or "womb"), symbol of goddess Shakti, female creative energy.

Shaivism was the religion of Chenla (ca. 550 - ca. 800 AD), including elements of Hinduism, Buddhism and indigenous ancestor cults. In the Sambor Prei Kuk temples, it is possible to contemplate stone inscriptions in both Sanskrit and Khmer, naming both Hindu and local ancestral deities with Shiva and several altars with the lingam.

Gallery

See also 
 List of World Heritage Sites in Cambodia
 Khmer architecture
 Hindu temple architecture

Notes 

Buildings and structures in Kampong Thom province
Archaeological sites in Cambodia
Former populated places in Cambodia
World Heritage Sites in Cambodia
Angkorian sites in Kampong Thom Province
Chenla